Regina Airport may refer to:

 Regina International Airport (IATA: YQR, ICAO: CYQR) in Regina, Saskatchewan, Canada
 Regina Airport Authority
 Régina Airport (IATA: REI, ICAO: SOOR) in Régina, French Guiana
 Regina/Aerogate Aerodrome (TC LID: CAG2)
 Regina Beach Airport (TC  LID: CKL9)